Utricularia purpureocaerulea is a small, probably perennial, carnivorous plant that belongs to the genus Utricularia. U. purpureocaerulea is endemic to the Brazilian states of Bahia, Goiás, and Minas Gerais and is only known from six collections in these locations. U. purpureocaerulea was originally described and published by Augustin Saint-Hilaire and Frédéric de Girard in 1838.

See also 
 List of Utricularia species

References 

Carnivorous plants of South America
Endemic flora of Brazil
purpureocaerulea
Plants described in 1838